Scent of a Woman is a 1992 American drama film produced and directed by Martin Brest that tells the story of a preparatory school student who takes a job as an assistant to an irritable, blind, medically retired Army lieutenant colonel. The film is a remake of Dino Risi's 1974 Italian film Profumo di donna, adapted by Bo Goldman from the novel Il buio e il miele by Giovanni Arpino. The film stars Al Pacino and Chris O'Donnell, with James Rebhorn, Philip Seymour Hoffman and Gabrielle Anwar in supporting roles.

The film was shot primarily around New York state, and also on location at Princeton University, at the Emma Willard School, an all-girls school in Troy, New York, and at the Ethical Culture Fieldston School in New York City.

The film was released on December 23, 1992. It received generally positive response from the critics and was a box office success. Pacino won the Academy Award for Best Actor for his performance and the film was nominated for Best Director, Best Picture and Best Screenplay Based on Material Previously Produced or Published. The film won three major awards at the Golden Globe Awards: Best Screenplay, Best Actor and Best Motion Picture – Drama.

Plot
Charlie Simms is a scholarship student at Baird, an exclusive New England preparatory school. He accepts a temporary job over Thanksgiving weekend so he can buy a plane ticket home to Oregon for Christmas. The woman who hires him asks Charlie to watch over her uncle, retired Army Lieutenant Colonel Frank Slade, a blind, highly decorated Vietnam War veteran whom Charlie discovers to be a cantankerous alcoholic.

Charlie and another student, George Willis Jr., witness three students setting up a prank to publicly humiliate the headmaster, Mr. Trask. After falling victim to the prank, Trask quickly learns of the witnesses and unsuccessfully presses them to name the perpetrators. Trask privately offers Charlie a bribe: a letter of recommendation to attend Harvard University.

Frank unexpectedly takes Charlie on a trip to New York City, where they stay at the Waldorf-Astoria hotel. During dinner at the Oak Room, Frank glibly states his intention to commit suicide. They pay an uninvited visit to the home of Frank's brother in White Plains for Thanksgiving dinner, where the cause of Frank's blindness is revealed: while drunk, he juggled live grenades to show off for a group of younger officers, and one exploded. Frank deliberately provokes everyone at dinner, which ends after a heated confrontation with his nephew Randy.

As they return to New York City, Charlie tells Frank about his problem at school. Frank advises Charlie to turn informant and go to Harvard, warning him that George will probably submit to Trask's pressure, so he should act and obtain a benefit before George does. While at a restaurant, Frank notices Donna, a young woman waiting for her date. He leads her to the dance floor, where they perform a spectacular tango ("Por una Cabeza").

Deeply despondent the next morning, Frank is initially uninterested in Charlie's suggestions for that day's activities until he brings up test driving a new Ferrari. Frank talks the reluctant salesman into letting them take the car. Once on the road, Frank is unenthusiastic until Charlie allows him to drive, which results in a traffic stop, but Frank talks the police officer into letting them go without revealing that he is blind.

After returning the car and waiting to cross the street, Frank grows impatient and walks into the middle of Park Avenue, where he narrowly avoids being struck by multiple cars. When they return to the hotel, Frank sends Charlie to run several errands. Charlie initially leaves but quickly becomes suspicious. He returns to find Frank in his dress uniform and preparing to commit suicide with his service pistol. They fight over the gun, but Frank backs down after Charlie convinces him that he has much to live for and should face his circumstances courageously.

Charlie and George are subjected to a formal inquiry by the student/faculty disciplinary committee, with the rest of the student body on hand to observe. As Trask opens the proceedings, Frank unexpectedly appears and sits with Charlie. George enlists the help of his wealthy father and they name the three perpetrators. When pressed for details, the Willises claim George Jr.'s poor vision prevented him from seeing more and defer to Charlie. Charlie refuses to inform, so Trask recommends his expulsion. Frank changes his earlier position and launches into a passionate speech defending Charlie, in which he reminds the audience to value qualities like loyalty, integrity and courage. The disciplinary committee places the perpetrators on probation, deny George any reward for having named them and excuse Charlie from the rest of the proceedings.

As Charlie escorts Frank to his limousine, Frank flirts with political science professor Christine Downes, a member of the disciplinary committee, who commends him for his speech. He impresses her by telling her the brand of her perfume ("Fleurs de Rocaille"). Afterwards he accurately describes her to Charlie, including her height and hair color. Charlie brings Frank home, where Frank happily greets his niece's children.

Cast

In addition, the three vandals are played by Nicholas Sadler (the ringleader), Todd Louiso and Matt Smith, while Gene Canfield plays limo driver Manny and Frances Conroy plays Christine Downes, the teacher that Slade sweet talks after the tribunal.

Production
Screenplay writer for Scent of a Woman, Bo Goldman, said, "If there is a moral to the film, it is that if we leave ourselves open and available to the surprising contradictions in life, we will find the strength to go on."

Casting
Matt Damon, Ben Affleck, Brendan Fraser, Dante Basco, Chris Rock, and Stephen Dorff were auditioned for the role of Charlie Simms. Jack Nicholson was offered the role of Lt. Col. Frank Slade but turned it down.

Research
Pacino painstakingly researched his part in Scent of a Woman. To understand what it feels like to be blind, he met clients of New York's Associated Blind, being particularly interested in seeing from those who had lost their sight due to trauma. Clients traced the entire progression for him—from the moment they knew they would never see again to the depression and through to acceptance and adjustment. The Lighthouse, also in New York, schooled him in techniques a blind person might use to find a chair and seat themselves, pour liquid from a bottle and light a cigar.

Filming
Scent of a Woman was filmed in the following US locations.
 Brooklyn, New York City
 Dumbo, Brooklyn, New York City
 Emma Willard School, 285 Pawling Avenue, Troy, New York
 Hempstead House, Sands Point Preserve, 95 Middleneck Road, Port Washington, Long Island, New York (school)
 Kaufman Astoria Studios, 34-12 36th Street, Astoria, Queens, New York City, (studio)
 Long Island, New York
 Manhattan, New York City
 Newark Liberty International Airport, Newark, New Jersey
 Pierre Hotel, Fifth Avenue & 61st Street, Manhattan, New York City, (ballroom where Frank and Donna dance the tango)
 Port Washington, Long Island, New York
 Prince's Bay, Staten Island, New York City
 Princeton, New Jersey
 Queens, New York City
 Rockefeller College—Upper Madison Hall, Princeton University, Princeton, New Jersey (Scene at the Library)
 Staten Island, New York City
 The Oak Room, The Plaza Hotel, 5th Avenue, Manhattan, New York City, (where Frank and Charlie have dinner)
 Troy, New York
 Waldorf-Astoria Hotel, 301 Park Avenue, Manhattan, New York City

Music
 Scent of a Woman (soundtrack)

Reception

Box office
The film earned 63,095,253 in the US and Canada and over $71 million internationally (excluding Italy), totaling $134,095,253 worldwide.

Critical response
Scent of a Woman holds an 87% approval rating on review aggregator Rotten Tomatoes from 47 reviews. The site's consensus states: "It might soar on Al Pacino's performance more than the drama itself, but what a performance it is -- big, bold, occasionally over-the-top, and finally giving the Academy pause to award the star his first Oscar." The film holds a score of 59 out of 100 on Metacritic, based on 14 critic reviews, indicating "mixed reviews".

Some criticized the film for its length. Varietys Todd McCarthy said it "goes on nearly an hour too long". Newsweeks David Ansen writes that the "two-character conceit doesn't warrant a two-and-a-half-hour running time".

Accolades
Al Pacino won an Academy Award for Best Actor, the first of his career after four previous nominations for Best Actor, and his eighth overall nomination.

The film is recognized by American Film Institute in these lists:
 2005: AFI's 100 Years...100 Movie Quotes:
 Lt. Col. Frank Slade: "Hoo-ah!" – Nominated
 2006: AFI's 100 Years...100 Cheers – Nominated

Notes

References

External links 

 
 
 
 
 
 
 

1992 drama films
1992 films
American coming-of-age drama films
1990s coming-of-age drama films
American remakes of Italian films
Best Drama Picture Golden Globe winners
Films about alcoholism
Films about blind people
Films based on Italian novels
Films directed by Martin Brest
Films featuring a Best Actor Academy Award-winning performance
Films featuring a Best Drama Actor Golden Globe winning performance
Films scored by Thomas Newman
Films set in New York City
Films shot in New Jersey
Films shot in New York City
Films shot in Newark, New Jersey
Films with screenplays by Bo Goldman
Tango films
Universal Pictures films
1990s English-language films
1990s American films